Sandpit Hole and Bishop's Lot is a 1.8 hectare geological Site of Special Scientific Interest near Ebbor Gorge in Somerset, notified in 1987.

This site consists of two of the largest isolated depressions, known as dolines, occurring in the Mendip limestone area, and both appear to have been formed by the limestones being dissolved by subterranean waters and the overlying rocks then collapsing into them.

Sources

 English Nature citation sheet for the site (accessed 10 August 2006)

External links
 English Nature website (SSSI information)

Sites of Special Scientific Interest in Somerset
Sites of Special Scientific Interest notified in 1987
Geology of Somerset